Vermilion County is a county in the eastern part of the U.S. state of Illinois, between the Indiana border and Champaign County. It was established in 1826 and was the 45th of Illinois' 102 counties. According to the 2010 United States Census, it had a population of 81,625, a decrease of 2.7% in 2000. It contains 21 incorporated settlements; the county seat and largest city is Danville.

Vermilion County is part of the Danville, Illinois, Metropolitan Statistical Area.

History

Vermilion County is named after the Vermilion River, which passes through the county and empties into the Wabash River in Indiana near Cayuga; the river was so named because of the color of the earth along its route.

The area which became Vermilion County was under the flag of France from 1682 to 1763, as part of New France. 

It was taken over by Great Britain for fifteen years after the French and Indian War; it then became part of the colonies after the Revolutionary War when the area was ceded to Virginia, titled "the Illinois County of Virginia". Later it was part of the Indiana Territory, then the Illinois Territory, and finally the state of Illinois. The county was created on 18 January 1826, from a portion of Edgar County. There was an unorganized territory to the north and west which was attached to the county; Champaign and Iroquois counties were formed from part of this territory in 1833. The remainder was used to create Ford County in 1859, the last Illinois county to be formed.

The county's saline springs were a strong attraction to early explorers; they were mentioned as early as 1801. Joseph Barron, an interpreter fluent in several Native American languages, stated in an affidavit that he was present at the "Vermilion Salines" that year. The production required 100 gallons of water for one bushel of salt and proved to be profitable from the first run (1822–1829), when salt became less expensive and the venture was no longer economical.

The area's first settlement was made in 1819 near these saline springs, by the Treat, Beckwith, and Whitcomb. James Butler, from Ohio, followed in 1820 and settled in the Catlin area; within a few years, the settlement grew to encompass several families and became known as "Butler's Point". In the southern part of the county, Henry Johnson built a cabin west of present-day Georgetown; this area was known as "Johnson's Point". The southern portion of the county was soon filled with small settlements. Most settlers in Vermilion County came from the American South, who had left because of their opposition to slavery.

Some of the early settlers were of the Religious Society of Friends, or Quakers. They founded the settlement of Vermilion Grove in the south part of the county, one of the county's first settlements and the site of the county's second public school.

The county has strong ties to Abraham Lincoln, who practiced law in Danville from 1841 to 1859 with Ward Hill Lamon; Lamon later served as Lincoln's bodyguard.  Lincoln spoke in Danville during his 1858 campaign for a seat in the US Senate. Lincoln gave the speech in his stocking feet from the balcony of Dr. William Fithian, a prominent local physician. The Fithian home is now listed on the National Register of Historic Places and serves as the Vermilion County Museum; visitors can see Lincoln memorabilia including a bed in which Lincoln slept.

The various stages in the evolution of Vermilion County are shown below.

Geography

Vermilion County in Illinois and Vermillion County in Indiana are two of twenty-two counties or parishes in the United States with the same name to border each other across state lines. The land in Vermilion County consists mostly of various forms of silt loam. Lake Vermilion, a man-made  reservoir, is the county's largest body of water, located northwest of Danville. It provides the city's culinary water, and also provides recreation opportunities.

Adjacent counties

 Iroquois County – north
 Benton County, Indiana – northeast
 Warren County, Indiana – east
 Vermillion County, Indiana – southeast
 Edgar County – south
 Douglas County - southwest
 Champaign County – west
 Ford County – northwest

Cities
 Danville (county seat)
 Hoopeston
 Georgetown

Villages

 Allerton – at SW corner of county; extends into Champaign County
 Alvin – north of Danville
 Belgium – on Route 1
 Bismarck – north of Danville
 Catlin – southwest of Danville
 Fairmount – southwest of Danville
 Fithian – west of Danville on US 150
 Henning – north of Danville on US 136
 Indianola – southwest of Danville
 Muncie – west of Danville on US 150
 Oakwood – west of Danville on US 150
 Potomac – on US 136 north of Danville
 Rankin – at NW corner of county
 Ridge Farm
 Rossville – on Route 1, south of Hoopeston
 Sidell – east of Allerton
 Tilton
 Westville

Unincorporated communities

 Armstrong
 Batestown
 Cheneyville
 Collison
 East Lynn
 Hartshorn
 Hegeler
 Hillery
 Hope
 Illiana
 Jamaica
 Jamesburg
 Midway
 Newtown
 Olivet
 Ryan
 Unionville

Previous settlements
Several towns were established in the county which no longer survive. In some cases, the coming of the railroads helped to define the best locations for settlements, and as a result some existing towns were abandoned. When Lake Vermilion was created, the town of Denmark was flooded and now lies at the bottom of the reservoir.

 Archie (south of Sidell)
 Blue Grass City
 Butler's Point (see Catlin)
 Conkeytown
 Denmark
 Ellis (Middlefork Township)
 Franklin (see Bismarck)
 Geneva
 Gilbert (see Alvin)
 Humrick
 Johnsonville (Blount Township)
 Munroe
 Myersville (see Bismarck)
 Pellsville (see Rankin)
 Prospect City
 Reilly (Butler Township)
 Shepherd's Town
 Watkins Grove (or Watkins Glen)
 Weaver City (see Ambia, Indiana)

Townships
Township government was adopted in Vermilion County in 1851, and eight townships were created:

 Carroll
 Danville
 Elwood
 Georgetown
 Middlefork
 Newell (first called Richland)
 Pilot
 Ross

Eleven additional townships were created in the following decades:

 Blount
 Butler
 Catlin
 Grant
 Jamaica
 Love
 McKendree
 Oakwood
 Sidell
 South Ross
 Vance

Parks
The Vermilion County Conservation District operates four parks:
 Forest Glen Preserve
 Heron County Park
 Kennekuk Cove County Park
 Lake Vermilion County Park

The Illinois Department of Natural Resources manages three areas in the county:
 Kickapoo State Recreation Area
 Harry "Babe" Woodyard State Natural Area
 Middle Fork State Fish and Wildlife Area

Demographics

As of the 2010 United States Census, there were 81,625 people, 32,655 households, and 21,392 families residing in the county. The racial makeup of the county was 82.5% white, 13.0% black or African American, 0.7% Asian, 0.2% American Indian, 1.5% from other races, and 2.2% from two or more races. Those of Hispanic or Latino origin made up 4.2% of the population. In terms of ancestry, 21.2% self-identified as American, 18.9% as German, 10.1% as Irish, and 9.1% as English.

Of the 32,655 households, 31.4% had children under the age of 18 living with them, 45.7% were married couples living together, 14.7% had a female householder with no husband present, 34.5% were non-families, and 29.8% of all households were made up of individuals. The average household size was 2.41 and the average family size was 2.96. The median age was 39.8 years.

The median income for a household in the county was $39,456 and the median income for a family was $49,429. Males had a median income of $40,107 versus $30,104 for females. The per capita income for the county was $20,218. About 14.6% of families and 18.7% of the population were below the poverty line, including 30.0% of those under age 18 and 9.1% of those age 65 or over.

Climate and weather

Vermilion County is in the humid continental climate region of the United States along with most of Illinois. Its Köppen climate classification is Dfa, meaning that it is cold, has no dry season, and has a hot summer. Average monthly precipitation ranged from  inches in February to  inches in June.

Transportation
Danville Mass Transit provides public transit to the Danville area with buses.

 Interstate 74 enters Vermilion County from the west on its way from Champaign–Urbana, and passes just to the north of the towns of Fithian, Muncie and Oakwood before passing through the south edge of the Kickapoo State Park, the north edge of Tilton and the south edge of Danville. Continuing east, it leaves the county and the state on its way to Indianapolis.
 US Route 136, which runs across five states, passes into Vermilion County from the west on its way from Rantoul. It passes east through the towns of Armstrong, Potomac and Henning; it reaches Illinois Route 1 south of Rossville and then shares that highway's route as it passes south through Danville. At the south edge of Danville it reaches Main Street and resumes its eastward heading, leaving the east edge of Danville and passing out of the county and state on its way to Covington, Indiana.
 US Route 150 enters the county from Champaign–Urbana to the west, running just to the south of Interstate 74 and passing through the towns of Fithian, Muncie and Oakwood. Just west of Danville it crosses to the north side of Interstate 74 as that highway veers to the southeast. In downtown Danville, it meets Illinois Route 1 and U.S. Route 136, and follows Route 1 to the south and continues through the towns of Belgium, Westville, Georgetown and Ridge Farm before entering Edgar County further to the south.
 Illinois Route 1 runs from the north to the south through the county, passing through Hoopeston, Rossville, Danville, Belgium, Westville, Georgetown and Ridge Farm.
 Illinois Route 9 runs from west to east near the north edge of the county and passes through Rankin and Hoopeston; upon reaching the Indiana border
 Indiana State Road 26 continues its route to the east toward Lafayette, Indiana.
 Illinois Route 49 is a north–south highway near the western edge of the county. It passes south through Rankin where it intersects Route 9; further south it passes near Armstrong where U.S. Route 136 briefly shares its route.

Four railroad lines pass through or into the county, all intersecting in the Danville area; this results in many different railroad crossings throughout the city:
 Norfolk Southern Railway line – enters the county from Decatur to the southwest and passes through Danville on its way to Lafayette, Indiana to the northeast
 CSX Transportation line - north-south through the county, connecting Chicago and Terre Haute, Indiana via Paris
 Kankakee, Beaverville and Southern Railroad line – north–south line through the county, to the east of the CSX line, a few miles from the state border, beginning in northern Iroquois County and running south through Danville, then veering east.
 Vermilion Valley Railroad line – a  line that connects the Flex-N-Gate factory west of Covington, Indiana with CSX in Danville.

The Vermilion Regional Airport is located northeast of Danville.

Economy
For 2014, Vermilion County had a workforce of 35,643 people; 32,584 were employed and 3,059 (8.6%) were unemployed.

Education
There are 12 school districts in the county that provide primary and secondary education. There are two post-secondary educational institutions: Danville Area Community College, a public two-year community college, and Lakeview College of Nursing, a four-year private institution (both located in Danville).

Government
Based on the 2000 census, Vermilion County is part of the Illinois's 15th congressional district; the Illinois Senate districts 52 and 53; and the Illinois House of Representatives districts 104 and 105.

Each township has a supervisor. The township board consists of the supervisor and four members elected at large from the township.

The Vermilion County Board is controlled by Republicans. Larry Baughn (R) of Hoopeston serves as chairman. The Vermilion County Circuit Court is led by Judge Thomas O’Shaugnessy.

Politics

See also
 Danville Area Community College
 Danville High School
 National Register of Historic Places listings in Vermilion County, Illinois
 Vermilion Regional Airport

References

Bibliography

External links
 Vermilion County official site
 Vermilion County Fact Sheet, Illinois State Archives
 Vermilion County and Danville Public Portal
 Vermilion County Museum
 Vermilion County War Museum
 Vermilion County Forest Preserves
 Cemeteries of Vermilion County Illinois

 
Illinois counties
1826 establishments in Illinois
Populated places established in 1826